Dr. William H. "Bill" Cade is a biologist and a former president of the University of Lethbridge. He researches the role of acoustic signals in field cricket mating behaviour.

Education

Cade completed his BA (1968), MA (1972) and PhD (1976) in Zoology at the University of Texas at Austin.  While an undergraduate at Texas, Cade became a member of the Tau chapter of the Kappa Sigma fraternity.   For his master's degree he worked with Professor Osmond Breland on unusual aspects of insect sperm cell.   Cade's doctoral work was on the evolution of mating behavior in insects and he studied with Professor Daniel Otte.

Research

Cade has done research in evolution of animal behavior, insect reproductive behavior, acoustic signals in cricket, cockroach mating behavior, and parasite-prey coevolution.

Flies and crickets

In 1975, together with his wife, Elsa Salazar Cade, Cade discovered the parasitic fly Ormia ochracea is attracted to the song of male crickets. Only female flies are attracted to the song, and they deposit living larvae on and in the vicinity of calling males. The larvae burrow into and eat the cricket who dies in about 7 days when the flies pupate. This was the first example of a natural enemy that locates its host or prey using the mating signal of the host/prey.

In late 2006, research by Marlene Zuk revealed the relationship between the cricket and the fly as one of the fastest examples of evolution ever recorded. Pressure from the O. ochracea has caused the crickets to evolve a silent male with wings that look like female wings.

Cade has a long collaboration with Dan Otte collecting and studying the crickets and grasshoppers of Africa.

Other
While Dean of Science at Brock, Bill Cade helped establish the Cool Climate Oenology and Viticulture Institute.

References

External links
Cricket Research: Being "Eaten Alive for Love" the Cost of Attracting a Mate 
Personal website
University of Lethbridge president's page

Evolutionary biologists
People from San Antonio
University of Texas at Austin College of Natural Sciences alumni
Academic staff of the University of Lethbridge
American entomologists
Living people
People from Bexar County, Texas
Year of birth missing (living people)